Glaude is a surname. Notable people with the surname include:

Donald Glaude, American house music artist, DJ, and remixer
Eddie Glaude (born 1968), African-American Studies scholar
Gerry Glaude (1927–2017), Canadian ice hockey player

See also
Claude (surname)